The Swan  is a 1925 American silent comedy film directed by Dimitri Buchowetzki and starring Frances Howard, Adolphe Menjou and Ricardo Cortez. It was produced by Famous Players-Lasky and distributed by Paramount Pictures.

Production background
The film is based on Melville Baker's 1923 Broadway play adaptation, The Swan, of Ferenc Molnar's play A Hattyu Vigjatek Harom Felvonasbarn.

This film was directed by Dimitri Buchowetzki, a recent Russian immigrant working for Famous Players-Lasky. Buchowetzki had directed pictures in Russia, Sweden, and Germany. The story of this film was remade in 1930 as One Romantic Night, an early talkie for Lillian Gish, and in Technicolor as a 1956 vehicle for Grace Kelly.

Cast
 Frances Howard as Alexandra, The Swan
 Adolphe Menjou as Albert von Kersten-Rodenfels
 Ricardo Cortez as Dr. Walter, the Tutor
 Ida Waterman as Princess Beatrice
 Helen Lindroth as Amphirosa
 Helen Lee Worthing as Wanda von Gluck
 Joseph Depew as Prince George
 George Walcott as Prince Arsene
 Michael Visaroff as Father Hyacinth
 Michael Vavitch as Colonel Wunderlich 
 Nicholas Soussanin as Lutzow
 Arthur Donaldson as Franz, the Court Chamberlain
 General Lodijensky as Master of the Hunt
 Clare Eames as Princess Dominica

Preservation status
This silent version survives and can be found on home video and DVD.

References

External links
 The Swan at IMDB
 The Swan at SilentEra
 The Swan at Allmovie
 
 
 Lobby cards for The Swan

1925 films
1925 comedy films
American silent feature films
American films based on plays
Films based on works by Ferenc Molnár
Famous Players-Lasky films
Films directed by Dimitri Buchowetzki
Films set in Europe
American black-and-white films
Silent American comedy films
1920s American films